Conal Robert Gregory (born 11 March 1947) was Conservative Party (UK) Member of Parliament for York from 1983 to 1992, when he lost the seat to Labour Party candidate Hugh Bayley.

He was educated at King's College School, Wimbledon and the University of Sheffield. He is a Master of Wine and has worked for many years in the wine trade. He is the author of a number of publications on the subject. He became a journalist writing for the Financial Times, Guardian and was made the personal Financial Editor of the Yorkshire Post winning Regional Financial Journalist of the Year Award in 2016

References 

Times Guide to the House of Commons 1992

External links 
 

1947 births
Living people
People educated at King's College School, London
Alumni of the University of Sheffield
Conservative Party (UK) MPs for English constituencies
UK MPs 1983–1987
UK MPs 1987–1992